Miri District is an administrative district in Miri Division, Sarawak, Malaysia covering a total area of 4707 km2. The Miri District can be divided into Miri City (997.43 km2), Sibuti sub-district (842.47 km2), and Niah sub-district (2887.21 km2). They are governed by Miri District Office located in Miri City, Sibuti sub-district office, and Niah sub-district office. The Miri City is administered by Miri City Council (MCC). Meanwhile, Niah and Sibuti sub-district falls under the jurisdiction of Subis District Council headquartered at Bekenu.

Federal Parliament and State Assembly Seats 

List of Miri district representatives in the Federal Parliament (Dewan Rakyat)

List of Miri district representatives in the State Legislative Assembly of Sarawak

Demography
There has been a growth of Miri District population of 3.5% from 1991 to 2000. Meanwhile, from 2000 to 2010, there is a population growth of 2.88%.
{| class="wikitable" style="text-align: center;"
! Year
| 1991 || 2000 ||2010
|-
! Totalpopulation
| 161,373 || 221,055 || 294,716
|-
|}

References